is a public observatory located in Saku, Nagano, Japan.

Saku is one of the best places for astronomical observation in Japan because of high altitude, high rate of sunny days, and limpid air.

Visitors are allowed to watch stars through the large telescope from 10 a.m. to 10 p.m.

History 
The observatory was founded by Usuda. It was transferred to (new) Saku on April 1, 2005 when Usuda has merged with (old) Saku, Mochizuki, and Asashina.

Telescopes 

The main telescope of the observatory is 600 mm Cassegrain reflector constructed by Mitaka Kohki. It has the "Wonder Eye" flexible focal extending system which provides "barrier free" star watching.

It is also equipped with two 200 mm refractors also constructed by Mitaka Kohki.

See also 
 Saku
 Saku Children's Science Dome for the Future
 Usuda Deep Space Center
 List of astronomical observatories
 List of astronomical societies
 Lists of telescopes

References

External links 
 Usuda Star Dome 

Astronomical observatories in Japan
Public observatories
Buildings and structures in Nagano Prefecture
Tourist attractions in Nagano Prefecture
Saku, Nagano